The 1965–66 British Home Championship was a cause of great excitement as it supplied spectators and commentators a view of England prior to their contesting the 1966 FIFA World Cup on home soil at which they were one of the favourites. None of the other Home Nations had qualified for the World Cup and so were determined to spoil England's preparation, leading to some very dramatic and heavily contested matches, particularly England's final game in Glasgow.

The England team began with a subdued goalless draw with the Welsh side whilst Ireland beat Scotland 3–2 in a close fought game at home. Both England and Scotland improved in their second games, England beating a tough Irish side at home 2–1, whilst the Scots put four goals past the struggling Welsh. Wales suffered further in their final match of the series, losing 1–4 at home to the Irish, who claimed a surprise second place in the tournament. England and Scotland then played a thrilling game in Glasgow, which England finally won 4–3 to take the title of British Champions, a title they would add to at the World Cup three months later.

Table

Results

References

External links
Full Results and Line-ups

1966
1966 in British sport
1965–66 in Northern Ireland association football
1965–66 in English football
1965–66 in Scottish football
1965–66 in Welsh football